Cyberdelic (from "cyber-" and "psychedelic") was the fusion of cyberculture and the psychedelic subculture that formed a new counterculture in the 1980s and 1990s.

Cyberdelic art was created by calculating fractal objects and representing the results as still images, animations, underground, algorithmic music, or other media.

Cyberdelic rave dance parties featured psychedelic trance music alongside laser light shows, projected images, and artificial fog, while attendees often used club drugs.

Advocates
Timothy Leary, an advocate of psychedelic drug use who became a cult figure of the hippies in the 1960s, reemerged in the 1980s as a spokesperson of the cyberdelic counterculture, whose adherents called themselves "cyberpunks", and became one of the most philosophical promoters of personal computers (PC), the Internet, and immersive virtual reality. Leary proclaimed that the "PC is the LSD of the 1990s" and admonished bohemians to "turn on, boot up, jack in".

In contrast to some of the hippies of the 1960s who were antiscience and antitechnology, the cyberpunks of the 1980s and 1990s ecstatically embraced technology and the hacker ethic. They believed that high technology (and smart drugs) could help human beings overcome limits, that it could liberate them from authority and even enable them to transcend space, time, and body. They often expressed their ethos and aesthetics through cyberart and reality hacking.

R. U. Sirius, co-founder and original editor-in-chief of Mondo 2000, became a prominent promoter of the cyberpunk ideology, whose adherents were pioneers in the IT industry of Silicon Valley and the West Coast of the United States.

In 1992, Billy Idol became influenced by the cyberdelic subculture and the cyberpunk fiction genre. The result of his passion for the ideals behind the culture resulted in his 1993 concept album, Cyberpunk, which Idol hoped would introduce Idol's fans and other musicians to the opportunities presented by digital technology and cyberculture. Timothy Leary and other members of the cyberdelic movement were contacted by Idol, and participated in the album's creation. The album was a critical and financial failure, and polarized online cyberculture communities of the period. Detractors viewed it as an act of co-optation and opportunistic commercialization. It was also seen as part of a process that saw the overuse of the term "cyberpunk" until the word lost meaning.  Alternatively, supporters saw Idol's efforts as harmless and well-intentioned, and were encouraged by his new interest in cyberculture.

Collapse
After the dot-com bubble of the late 1990s burst in 2000, the techno-utopianism that prevailed in the cyberdelic counterculture waned while technorealism grew. Most cyberpunks realized that the PC, the Internet, and other new technologies did not really bring the radical social, political, and personal changes they thought they would, specifically the "cybersociety" - a postpolitical, non-hierarchical society made possible by cyberware, in which the computer-literate, super-intelligent, open-minded, change-oriented, self-reliant, irreverent free-thinker is the norm and the person who is not internetted and does not think for themself and does not question authority is the "problem person".

Disillusioned, R. U. Sirius condemned cyberdelic escapism:

See also

Algorave
Cybergoth
Demoscene
Fractal art
Immersive technology
Postcyberpunk
Virtual world

References

Further reading
 
 Mondo 2000: A User's Guide to the New Edge Rudy Rucker, R.U. Sirius, Queen Mu

External links
"Beyond Cyberpunk!:The Web Version", by Gareth Branwyn. (ca 1991)  An online version of the original HyperCard stack about cyberdelic culture.  Was updated in '93 with new material.

Media
"Tim Leary and the Cyberpunks", Allan Lundell, YouTube, February 11, 2009. Timothy Leary describes the cyberdelic/cyberpunk movement in context of the Cyberpunk album, by Billy Idol.
"Timothy Leary Interviews Billy Idol - In Concert with The Ramones" (1993), an interview discussing the cyberpunk counterculture for the ABC television show, In Concert, hosted by the Internet Archive.
"Lecture for the Whole Life Expo in Los Angeles" (November 1989), a Timothy Leary lecture on connections between psychedelic and cybernetic cultures, hosted by the Internet Archive.

Computing culture
Counterculture
Cyberpunk culture
Cyberpunk themes
Psychedelia
Subcultures